Tetratricopeptide repeat protein 1 is a protein that in humans is encoded by the TTC1 gene.

Interactions
TTC1 has been shown to interact with HSPA4.

References

Further reading